Sandford Park Alehouse is a pub at 20 High Street, Cheltenham, Gloucestershire, England, it opened in 2010.

It was CAMRA's National Pub of the Year for 2015.

It is in a grade II listed building.

References

External links
 

Grade II listed pubs in Gloucestershire
Buildings and structures in Cheltenham
Pubs in Gloucestershire